The Seward Mountains is a small mountain range in southeastern Alaska, United States, located on the upper Portland Canal. It has an area of 107 km2 and is a subrange of the Boundary Ranges which in turn form part of the Coast Mountains. Part of the eastern border of Misty Fjords National Monument transects the range. Despite its name, the Seward Mountains are located nowhere near Seward, Alaska or the Seward Peninsula, though the Seward Peninsula has its own set of four maintain ranges: the Kigluaik Mountains, Bendeleben Mountains, Darby Mountains, and York Mountains.

See also
List of mountain ranges

References

Boundary Ranges
Landforms of Prince of Wales–Hyder Census Area, Alaska
Mountains of Ketchikan Gateway Borough, Alaska
Mountains of Unorganized Borough, Alaska